Jin Yi is the name of:

Jin Yi (金禕) (died 218), son of Han dynasty warlord Jin Xuan, participated in a rebellion in 218
Jin Yi (poet) (1770–1794), Qing dynasty poet
Jin Shaoshan (1889–1948), Chinese Peking opera actor, born Jin Yi